Hungarian Civic Alliance can refer to:

 Fidesz - Hungarian Civic Union
 Hungarian Civic Alliance (Serbia)
 Hungarian Civic Party (Romania), formerly the Hungarian Civic Alliance